The Tennessee Bureau of Investigation (TBI) is the state bureau of investigation of the state of Tennessee. It has statutory authority to conduct criminal investigations and make arrests of crimes occurring throughout the state. The bureau is analogous to the FBI on the federal level.

History 
The Tennessee Bureau of Investigation was born as a result of a highly publicized murder in Greene County, Tennessee, in December 1949. The heinous crime aroused the emotion of citizens throughout the region. In an address to the Tennessee Press Association in January 1951, John M. Jones Sr., publisher of the Greeneville Sun, called for the creation of an unbiased state agency to assist local law enforcement in the investigation of serious crimes.

On March 14, 1951, Governor Gordon Browning signed a bill into law establishing the Tennessee Bureau of Criminal Identification as the plainclothes division of the Department of Safety. Following a series of legislative hearings by the Tennessee General Assembly, the organization was re-established on March 27, 1980, as an independent agency and renamed the Tennessee Bureau of Investigation.

Overview 
The bureau manages the state's three crime labs, assists local law enforcement in investigating major crimes, and conducts special investigations related to illegal drugs, fugitives, public corruption, official misconduct, organized crime, domestic terrorism, healthcare fraud, arson, explosives, and patient abuse.

The TBI has statutory responsibility for collecting state crime statistics, which are published in an annual report. It also manages a TBI most wanted list, amber alert program, and statewide registries of sex offenders and methamphetamine offenders. Besides its headquarters in Nashville, the TBI has offices in Chattanooga, Cookeville, Jackson, Johnson City, Knoxville, and Memphis.

The bureau is headed by a director appointed by the Governor of Tennessee to a six-year term. The director is also a member of the Tennessee Law Enforcement Planning Commission. Its incumbent director is former Knoxville chief of police, David B. Rausch, appointed in 2018. , the agency employs about 550 people, about half of whom are commissioned officers.

Controversy 
Its incumbent director was appointed after previous director Mark Gwyn retired less than two years into his third term, amid controversies regarding nepotism in his hiring practices followed by a scathing audit by the comptroller's office which found he had overspent his budget for four years running.

The interim director, Jason Locke, also came under investigation the day David B. Rausch was appointed due to a complaint received from his wife describing misuse of state funds during an affair with another state employee at the Tennessee Department of Mental Health and Substance Abuse Services.

See also 
 List of law enforcement agencies in Tennessee

References

External links 
 

1980 establishments in Tennessee
State agencies of Tennessee
Tennessee
State law enforcement agencies of Tennessee